Lepidosina is a genus of flies belonging to the family lesser dung flies.

Species
L. angusticercus Marshall & Buck, 2007
L. argentinensis Marshall & Buck, 2007
L. cubensis Marshall & Buck, 2007
L. evanescens Marshall & Buck, 2007
L. gibba (Spuler, 1925)
L. inaequalis (Malloch, 1914)
L. multispinulosa Marshall & Buck, 2007
L. platessa Marshall & Buck, 2007
L. proxineura Marshall & Buck, 2007
L. quadrisquamosa Marshall & Buck, 2007
L. rutricauda Marshall & Buck, 2007

References

Sphaeroceridae
Diptera of South America
Brachycera genera